Jumayjimah    is a village in the  Bint Jbeil District in southern Lebanon, located north-east of Tebnine.

Name
According to E. H. Palmer, the name El Jumeijmeh comes from "The little sculls".

History
In 1881, the PEF's Survey of Western Palestine (SWP)  described it: "A small village of stone and mud, containing about 100 Metawileh, situated on hill-top, with a few olives and figs around. Water supply from cisterns."

On 29 September 1992, following an attack on a South Lebanon Army outpost in Rachaf, Hizbullah fighters shot their way through a Unifil checkpoint at Jumayjimah. One Irish soldier was killed, bring the total number of Unifil soldiers killed to 187, 33 of them from Ireland.

References

Bibliography

External links
  Jmaijmeh, Localiban
Survey of Western Palestine, Map 2:   IAA, Wikimedia commons
 

Populated places in Bint Jbeil District
Shia Muslim communities in Lebanon